Admiral Sir Royston Hollis Wright  (29 September 1908 – 18 July 1977) was a senior Royal Navy officer who went on to be Second Sea Lord and Chief of Naval Personnel.

Naval career
Educated at Haileybury College and the Royal Naval College Dartmouth, Wright joined the Royal Navy in 1927. In 1939 he was made Commanding Officer of the destroyer HMS Beagle. In 1941 he went on to command the destroyer HMS Derwent which was badly damaged by a torpedo in Tripoli Harbour. In 1943 he took command of the destroyer HMS Hurworth which was later sunk later that year during the Aegean Campaign of World War II.

In 1948 he took command of the destroyer HMS Wakeful. He went on to be Director of the Manning Department at the Admiralty in 1950 before becoming Commanding Officer of the aircraft carrier HMS Triumph in 1953. He became Commodore of the Royal Naval Barracks at Devonport in 1955, Assistant Chief of the Naval Staff in 1956, Flag Officer Flotillas for the Home Fleet in 1958 and Flag Officer, Scotland and Northern Ireland in 1959.

He became Second Sea Lord and Chief of Naval Personnel in 1961: in this capacity he considered a plan to fly sailors' wives out to the Far East Fleet to reduce the strain of separation. He retired in 1965.

In 1969 he was Chairman of the Royal Navy Club of 1765 & 1785 (United 1889).

Family
In 1945 he married Betty Lilian Ackery; they had no children.

References

|-

1908 births
1977 deaths
People educated at Haileybury and Imperial Service College
Knights Grand Cross of the Order of the British Empire
Knights Commander of the Order of the Bath
Companions of the Distinguished Service Order
Royal Navy admirals
Lords of the Admiralty